Takahashi Inari Shrine (高橋稲荷神社, Takahashi inari jinja) is a Shinto Inari shrine, dedicated to the worship of the kami Inari. It is located in Kumamoto, Kumamoto Prefecture. Its main festival is held annually on November 8. It was founded in 1496.

See also
Inari shrine

1496 establishments in Asia
Shinto shrines in Kumamoto Prefecture
1490s establishments in Japan
Inari shrines
Beppyo shrines